Deewaar: Let's Bring Our Heroes Home is a 2004 Indian Hindi-language action thriller film written and directed by Milan Luthria, produced by Gaurang Doshi and co-written by S. Gopala Reddy. The film stars Amitabh Bachchan, Sanjay Dutt, Akshaye Khanna and Amrita Rao. It has no connection to the 1975 film Deewaar, also starring Bachchan, and is inspired by the 1963 film The Great Escape.

Deewaar: Let's Bring Our Heroes Home released worldwide on 25 June 2004 and received mixed-to-positive reviews from critics, with praise for the performances of Bachchan, Khanna and Dutt, but criticism for its length and pacing. Commercially, the film was unsuccessful.

Plot 

Indian Army Major Ranvir Kaul and some 30 of his colleagues were captured in Pakistan and held under brutal conditions for 33 years. Kaul attempts another escape but is caught, beaten, berated, and thrown back in prison. During the fracas, one of his men does flee and, through a sympathetic friend, Jabbar, sends a letter home. Kaul's wife and son petition the Indian Army, but the General, though sympathetic, has his hands tied. He raises the subject, and Pakistan will deny it, and immediately the men will be shot; he cannot authorize Army action absent hard evidence (not just a letter); there are no other options. Kaul's son, Gaurav sets off to find his father.

Gaurav meets Jabbar and discovers that his father has been transferred to a different prison camp, Saran Jail, under the cunning and sadistic Sohail. Kaul meets another set of captured Indian POWs at this new prison. Kaul attempts another escape. One man sacrifices himself on the electric fence as others go through. Sohail bemusedly sighs as the others, once past the fence, are blown up by the landmines. Kaul and the remaining prisoners are again beaten and kicked back into their barracks. One of the prisoners, Khan manages to evade the landmines and escapes. Gaurav meets him accidentally and brings him to safety.

Gaurav attacks a military courier and in the very act of using his uniforms, infiltrates a Pakistan Army office block. He steals a set of plans which reveal a water main under the prison. His father and the men can dig their way to this main and crawl out. With great reluctance, Khan gets arrested again. Sohail correctly guesses that Khan is back for a reason. Khan discloses to Kaul that his son is here; this news, and the water main, is a great inspiration for the men.

The men quietly begin digging a tunnel to the water main. They discover the body of an Indian Army Captain Jatin in the debris under the prison, but this Jatin is among them! Khan and Kaul realize that he is, in fact, a Pakistani spy. Gaurav and Khan had planned the escape for the night of the tenth, and Jatin, the spy, had dutifully reported this back to Sohail. Kaul and Khan decide that the escape will happen on the ninth. Jatin is not told of this, but the men manage to send a coded message to Gaurav. The following day Khan notices the number 9 scrawled on an army supply truck entering the prison: it is Gaurav's reply. He will await the men near the water main outlet on the ninth.

On the night of the escape, the men overpower the guards and kill Jatin. They enter the water main and begin digging away the last few meters of remaining debris. The knocking in the pipes travels up to Sohail's kitchen sink; Sohail quickly discovers the escape and hotly pursues the men down the pipe. Gaurav digs from the other side, and, just in the nick of time, the debris is cleared, and father and son are reunited. The men make it through. One of them sacrifices himself on a land mine inside the water main which caves in and blocks Sohail.

Gaurav leads his father and the men to a railway line, but the train is delayed. The men split up to avoid detection and arrange to meet at dawn near a border point. They arrive at the border point, but Sohail and his men are in close pursuit. There is a firefight. Khan puts up a brave fight but is shot down. Ranvir Kaul and Gaurav and the handful of remaining prisoners finally get across the border in a Pakistan army truck. Sohail is right behind them, but his jeep is disarmed, and he is surrounded by Kaul and the prisoners. Kaul points to the border line behind them; they are now on Indian soil. Kaul, now an Indian Army soldier, attacks and kills Sohail in hand-to-hand combat, and throws his body across the border.

The film ends as Ranvir Kaul, and his men are reinstated in the Indian Army and salute the Indian tricolor.

Cast 

Amitabh Bachchan as Maj. Ranvir Kaul, Gaurav's father
Sanjay Dutt as Khan, Ranvir's fellow prisoner
Akshaye Khanna as Gaurav Kaul, Ranvir's son
Piyush Mishra as Qureshi
Amrita Rao as Radhika, Jabbar's daughter
Raghuvir Yadav as Jata
Kay Kay Menon as Sohail Miyaan
Nishikant Dixit as Capt. Ajit Verma
Aditya Srivastava as Eijaz Shaikh
Rajendranath Zutshi as Capt. Jatin Kumar/Pakistan spy
Akhilendra Mishra as Jabbar, Radhika's father
Tanuja as Ranvir Kaul's wife and Gaurav's mother
Pradeep Rawat as Baldev
Arif Zakaria as Rajan
D. Santosh as P.O.W. Raghu Jen
Kamlesh Sawant as Nayyar
Sanjay Narvekar as Marathe
Rajendra Gupta as Anand
Ashraful Haque as Naru
Sudhir

Music 
Music for the film was composed by Aadesh Shrivastav. The lyrics were written by Nusrat Badr.

"Ali Ali", sung by Krishna Beura, Shraddha Pandit and Vijayta (5:57)
"Chaliye Va Chaliye", sung by Udit Narayan and Roop Kumar Rathod (5:56)
"Kara Kaga", sung by Alka Yagnik (4:19)
"Marhaba Marhaba", sung by Sonu Nigam and Xenia Ali (5:18)
"Piya Bawri", sung by Alka Yagnik and Kailash Kher (4:52)
"Todenge Deewaar Hum", sung by Udit Narayan and Mukul Agrawal (4:43)

Critical reception 

Taran Adarsh rated the film 3/5 and stated: "DEEWAAR has an impressive cast, but it is Amitabh Bachchan who towers above all with a splendid and power-packed performance. The actor seems to be accomplishing the unattainable with every film [...] Sanjay Dutt is in form yet again. Although his role isn't as well defined as that of Big B or Akshaye Khanna, Dutt comes up with an extremely likeable performance that is sure to win him plaudits from the viewers. His dialogues are well worded and are sure to appeal to the masses. Akshaye Khanna is a treat to watch. The youngster proves yet again that he is amongst the most gifted actors of the present generation. Amrita Rao is wasted". Derek Elley of Variety stated, "Though its Indo-Pak politics are more Rambo than Romeo, as a barnstorming, jingoistic action movie, Deewaar delivers".

References

External links 
 

2000s Hindi-language films
2004 action thriller films
2004 films
Films directed by Milan Luthria
Films scored by Aadesh Shrivastava
India–Pakistan relations in popular culture
Indian action thriller films
Indian Army in films
Military of Pakistan in films